Pantheon I is an extreme metal band from Oslo, Norway, and sharing some current and past members with 1349. They have the particularity to include a cello artist in their line-up, and are often praised for being unafraid to experiment with their sound, while still keeping the musical ethos of black metal.

History
Pantheon I was founded as a side-project in 2002 by Tjalve (from 1349). He left 1349 in 2006 to focus on Pantheon I. He was joined by Seidemann (still in 1349) in 2004.

In December 2007 the band embarked on a tour in France as support of Mayhem.

In November 2008 they recorded a new song called "I'll Come Back As Fire", which was featured in the horror movie Someone's Knocking at the Door, by the American director Chad Ferrin.

Their most recent album, Worlds I Create, was released on 29 July 2009 in Europe and 11 August in North America.

In the start of 2010 Pantheon I will be part of the Summer Breeze Open Air heavy metal festival in Germany.

In November 2010, it was announced that Aethyris McKay had departed from Absu and joined Pantheon I.  McKay will be taking over guitar from Kvebek who will be focusing on vocals and McKay will also be singing clean vocals for the band.

Discography 
 Atrocity Divine - (2006)
 The Wanderer And His Shadow - (2007)
 Worlds I Create - (2009)

Band members 
 Andrè Kvebek - vocals and guitar (ex-1349)
 John Espen Sagstad - guitar
 Aethyris McKay - guitar
 Tor Risdal Stavenes - bass (Seidemann in 1349)
 Mads Guldbekkhei - drums
 Live Julianne Kostøl - cello

References

External links 

 Official Pantheon I Website
 Official Pantheon I MySpace

Norwegian heavy metal musical groups
Norwegian black metal musical groups
Musical groups established in 2002
2002 establishments in Norway
Musical groups from Oslo
Candlelight Records artists